Carilon may refer to:

 Carillon, a musical instrument of bells
 Carilon, an aliphatic polyketone that was made by Royal Dutch Shell